Monocerotesa virgata is a moth in the family Geometridae first described by Wileman in 1912. It can be found in Taiwan.

The wingspan is 20–24 mm.

References

Moths described in 1912
Boarmiini